The Canadian Top 50 Albums, published in RPM, was a record chart that features albums in Canada. The first chart started on October 14, 1968, and the last issue was October 30, 2000. There were seven number-one albums in 1968: the first was Wheels of Fire by Cream, and the last was The Beatles by The Beatles. Jimi Hendrix's Electric Ladyland spent the most weeks at number-one,  spending three weeks from November 18 to December 2. Wheels of Fire, Cheap Thrills by Big Brother and the Holding Company, and The Beatles all spent two weeks at number-one. Steppenwolf by Steppenwolf and Wichita Lineman by Glen Campbell spent one week at number-one.

Albums

References

1968
1968 in Canadian music
1968 record charts